Veeravanallur Vedantam Sadagopan (born 29 January 1915, disappeared 11 April 1980, date of death unknown) was an Indian university rank-holder, ICS aspirant, film actor, music teacher, performer, and composer.

Personal life
Born in Veeravanallur, a small town in Tirunelveli district, on 29 January 1915, Sadagopan, son of an insurance agent, Vedantam Iyengar, stood first in English, Maths, and Sanskrit in 1934 and came to Chennai to prepare for the Indian Civil Service examinations. His wife Ranganayaki Sadagopan used to accompany him on tanpura on occasion. The couple had 4 children. His sister Jayalakshmi Santhanam (1933-2018) was also a musician, known as Andhra's D K Pattammal, and a children's music teacher. His sister-in-law Ananthalakshmi Sadagopan (1928-2013), and her daughter Sujatha Vijayaraghavan and granddaughter Sumitra Nitin, are also noted musicians.

Writer
In Chennai, he became associated with Tamil writer V. Ramasamy, better known by his pen-name VaRaa, and entered journalism. He wrote for the popular weekly Tamil publication Ananda Vikatan.

He was a prolific writer in English and Tamil. Apart from articles on music, he has written poetry, lyrics and even a number of stories in Tamil, that were published in Ananda Vikatan.

Film Actor
"He was a star, handsome and charismatic. He was a graduate and an acclaimed Carnatic musician. When I learnt that the producers of the new film were planning to have him as the hero, I knew that I stood no chance of being considered for the role," wrote MGR about V.V. Sadagopan, and the words of the former actor-turned-Chief Minister speak volumes for his talent and personality.

His good looks and music talents soon drew him to films. He acted as the main actor in the Tamil film Nava Yuvan (Modern Youth) that had an alternate title Geethasaram (Essence of Gita). (It was customary for Tamil films at that time to have two names as titles).

The film was shot in London. It is the first ever Tamil film to be shot in a foreign country and V. V. Sadagopan became the first  to have acted in such a film.
This film bestowed on V. V. Sadagopan the distinction of being the first University graduate to have acted in Tamil films. The coronation ceremony of King George VI was also shown along with this film.

His second film Adhirstam (Luck) was released in 1939.

Gemini Studios started their film production in the year 1941 and produced the Tamil film Madanakamarajan. K. L. V. Vasantha, a successful and attractive heroine with many hits, played the female lead while Sadagopan was the hero.

The fourth film he acted was Venuganam released in 1941. The famous female musician N. C. Vasanthakokilam acted in the lead role with Sadagopan.

The fifth and final film he featured in was Jeevana Mukthi Telugu film produced by S. S. Vasan. He appeared as Lord Vishnu in the film.

He was hailed as "Rudolf Valentino of the Indian screen".

Afterwards, he decided not to continue the film career and went into the music field.

Music Performer
He had his musical training under Namakkal Sesha Iyengar and Ariyakudi Ramanuja Iyengar. He was a rare combination of a musician and a musicologist.

He delved deep into Vaishnavite literature and had given full-fledged concerts comprising verses from the Kamba Ramayanam.

He was a member of the audition panel of All India Radio (AIR) and also of the experts committee of the Madras Music Academy. He travelled all over India and abroad for his lecture-cum-music concerts. He represented Indian Music in the Centenary celebrations of the Moscow Conservatoire 1966.

Music Teacher
Teaching music to children was a subject important to Sadagopan and he launched the Tyaga Bharathi, a movement to carry out his mission.

The term Tyagabharathi was coined by him to epitomise the ideals of Saint Tyagaraja and Subramania Bharati.

"An ardent devotee of Tyagaraja’s music and admirer of Subramania Bharati’s ideas, he combined both to teach values to children. We used to visit schools and would sing and dance with children. They are not nursery rhymes, but penned and tuned to Carnatic music with the objective of moulding children," said Devika Raman, daughter of Sadagopan.

When Soundaram Ramachandaran, a Minister in Jawaharlal Nehru's Cabinet, launched the Gandhigram Rural Institute (GRI), she appointed Sadagopan as the Director of Music Studies.

"When Nehru visited the institution in 1959, he got a chance to watch the Kuravanji dance-drama of Sadagopan. So impressed was Nehru with Sadagopan’s talents that he appointed him as Professor of Music in Delhi University. He continued in the job till 1975.

He served two terms as professor at the University of Delhi. He was also a member of the board of studies in several universities.

Religious Contributions
V. V. Sadagopan, a Vaishnava, was deeply involved in religion, and has done extensive research on Naalayira Divya Prabhandham, a compilation of verses. He mentored disciples who went on to achieve great feats. His research was carried forward by his disciples. Srirama Bharathi is one of his disciples with whom he brought out a book called  ‘Spirals and Circles’ that explains the concept of carnatic music and thought processes associated with it.

Srirama Bharathi continued the works of the guru. A trust called Sri Sadagopan Thirunarayanaswami Divya Prabhanda Patasala started in the singer's name. Srirama Bharathi and his wife Sowbhagyalakshmi propagated Thyaga Bharathi songs through the trust and went on to compose tunes for Nalayira Divya Prabhandam. After the demise of her husband, Sowbhagyalakshmi continues the practice along with family and close associates. Targeting children, whom she feels would be the perfect audience, she conducts summer camps in schools and composes songs for mentally-challenged children in special schools.

Unique Compositions
He was a composer in several languages.

V. V. Sadagopan's compositions include kritis, keerthanas, ragamaligais, padams, kili kanni and a series of Tirukkuṛaḷ keerthanais, wherein the Kural forms the Pallavi and is elaborated in the Anupallavi and Charanam.

He set to music for the famous "Gana Mazhai Pozhigindraan", a song from Ambujam Krishna's first volume.

He was the first to render a whole music concert of Kamba Ramayanam verses at the Karaikudi Kamban vizha. The music was set by him.

He also set to music several Pasurams of Divya Prabandham.

He has composed quite a few songs using the mudra (signature) Seshadasan.

Disappearance
"He got off the train at Gudur in Andhra Pradesh on 11 April 1980, on his way from Delhi to Chennai. Afterwards there was no information about his whereabouts. His family still believes that he lives somewhere," said T.K. Venkatasubramanaian, retired Professor of History of the Delhi University.

Rumours of sighting him in Varanasi and in the Himalayas and consequent searches have yielded no results.

Centenary Remembrance
A birth centenary remembrance program was organised by Chandlian Memorial Trust and Lakshmi Kuppusamy Trust at Bharathiya Vidya Bhavan, Mylapore in Chennai on 8 February 2015.

See also
List of people who disappeared

References

External links
 Madhana Kama Rajan 1941 -- Premaa ... Premaa Nee Illaamal
 Madhana Kama Rajan 1941 -- Vaengai Vanna Thogai
 Madhana Kama Rajan 1941 -- Inrae Un Manam Iranginatho
 Madhana Kama Rajan 1941 -- Thunai Neeyae Arul Thaaraai
 Madhana Kama Rajan 1941 -- Vaazhvinil Inrae Nannaal
 Villinai Kavadi Sindhu
 His Legacy our mission
 Rama Bhajanai Seythaal
 V V Sadagopan - Music Mystic
 Photo of V V Sadagopan (1969 in London)
 Translation of the Prabandham

1960s missing person cases
1915 births
20th-century Indian male singers
20th-century Indian singers
Indian male film actors
Male Carnatic singers
Carnatic singers
Missing person cases in India
People from Tirunelveli district
Year of death unknown